DistroKid is an independent digital music distribution service, founded in 2013 by American entrepreneur Philip J. Kaplan.  DistroKid principally offers musicians and other rights-holders the opportunity to distribute and sell or stream their music through online retailers such as iTunes/Apple Music, Spotify, Pandora, Amazon Music, YouTube Music, Tidal, Deezer, iHeartRadio and others.

History 
DistroKid was developed in 2012 by Philip J. Kaplan and launched in mid 2013. It began as a side-feature of Kaplan's music social network, Fandalism, and was split out into its own company in 2015.

In July 2015, a DistroKid release by musical act Jack & Jack went to number one worldwide on the iTunes charts. This was particularly notable because DistroKid does not take a commission or royalties, making this the first time a number-one charting artist was able to keep 100% of their earnings.

In May 2016, DistroKid launched a feature called "Teams" that makes it possible for royalties to be automatically sent to collaborators and shareholders. Since then DistroKid has made several other developments including partnering with Spotify to support cross-platform uploads for Spotify artists who upload directly or have direct licensing deals with the company and an investment from Silversmith Capital Partners.

In 2021, the company launched an initiative allowing record labels to mine its data in search of new artists. It receives a finder's fee from record labels each time a label signs a new artist by way of the platform. The first label to take part in the initiative was Republic Records.

References

Distribution companies of the United States
Internet properties established in 2013
Entertainment companies established in 2013
American companies established in 2013